The Phipps Center for the Arts is a theatre and arts center in Hudson, Wisconsin, offering a variety of theatrical, musical, and artistic performances, in addition to art exhibits and arts-related classes and lessons. The facility is a non-profit, community-based organization offering cultural and artistic experiences to area residents.

Built in 1983 and expanded in 1992, the Phipps is operated mainly through the help of volunteers. It operates with a $1.2 million annual budget, in a $7 million facility. Its Endowment Fund is over $1 million.

In addition to art exhibit and classroom areas, there are multiple auditoriums. A main feature in the theatre is a Wurlitzer Theatre Organ, used for concerts, and to accompany silent films. This organ was originally installed in the Capitol Theatre in St. Paul in 1926. It was reinstalled in the KSTP Television Studios in Saint Paul in 1957 and then moved to the Phipps Center in 1983. The organ has three manuals, and 16 ranks (sets of pipes).

References

Theatres in Wisconsin
Theatres completed in 1983
Event venues established in 1983
Performing arts centers in Wisconsin
Silent film
Music venues in Wisconsin
1983 establishments in Wisconsin
Public venues with a theatre organ